The following is a list of notable individual K-pop artists.

Male

A

Ahn Jae-hyo
Ajoo
Alex Chu
Alexander Lee
Allen Kim
Andrew Choi
Andy Lee
Aron

B

B-Bomb
B.I
Babylon
Bae Jin-young
Bae Ki-sung
Baekho
Baekhyun
BamBam
Bang Ye-dam
Bang Yong-guk 
Baro 
Bernard Park
BM
Bobby
Boi B
Boo Seung-kwan
Brian Joo
Bumkey
Bumzu
Byung Hun

C

Cha Eun-woo
Chae Bo-hun 
Chan
Chancellor
Changjo
Changmin
Chen
Cho Kyu-hyun 
Cho Seung-youn
Choi Bo-min
Choi Byung-chan
Choi Hyun-suk
Choi Jong-hoon
Choi Jung-won
Choi Min-ho 
Choi Min-hwan 
Choi Si-won 
Choi Sung-min
Choi Young-jae
Choiza
Chun Myung-hoon
CNU
Cream
Crush

D

D.O.
Daesung
Danny Ahn
David Oh
Dawn
DJ Clazzi
DJ Shine
Do Han-se
Doyoung

E

Eddy Kim
Eli Kim
Eric Mun
Eric Nam
Eru
Eun Ji-won
Eunhyuk

G

G-Dragon 
G.O 
G.Soul 
Gaeko
Gaho
Gary
Gill
Gong Myung
Gongchan

H

H-Eugene
Ha Dong-kyun
Ha Sebin
Ha Sung-woon
Han Geng
Han Hee-jun
Han Seung-woo
Hangzoo
Hanhae
Henry Lau
Heo Jung-min
Heo Young-saeng
Hongseok
Hoya 
Huang Zitao
Huh Gak
Hui
Hwang Chan-sung 
Hwang Chi-yeul
Hwang Kwang-hee
Hwang Min-hyun
Hwanhee
Hyuk
Hyun Jin-young
Hyungwon

I

I'll 
I.M
Im Hyun-sik
Im Si-wan

J

J-Hope
Jackson Wang
Jae Park
Jaehyun 
Jang Beom-june
Jang Dae-hyeon
Jang Dong-woo 
Jang Han-byul
Jang Hyun-seung
Jang Jin-young
Jang Minho
Jang Su-won
Jang Woo-hyuk
Jang Wooyoung 
Jay
Jay B 
Jay Park
Jeong Jin-hwan
Jeong Jinwoon
Jeong Se-woon
Jero
Jimin
Jin Longguo
Jinho
Jinjin 
Jinu
Jinyoung
Jo Kwang-min
Jo Kwon 
Jo Young-min
John Park
Joo Jong-hyuk
Joohoney
Joon Park
JR
Jun Jin
Jun. K
Jun.Q
Jung Chan-woo
Jung Dae-hyun
Jung Il-hoon
Jung Jin-young 
Jung Joon-young
Jung Seung-hwan
Jung Yong-hwa 
Jung Yoon-hak
Junggigo
Jungkook
Jungyup
Justin

K 

K.Will
Kai 
Kang Chan-hee
Kang Daniel
Kang Doo 
Kang In-soo
Kang Kyun-sung
Kang Min-hyuk 
Kang Seung-yoon 
Kang Sung-hoon
Kang Tae-oh
Kangin
Kangnam
Kangta
Kanto
Kasper
Kebee
Ken
Kevin Moon
Kevin Oh
Kevin Woo
Key 
Kidoh
Kiggen
Kihyun
Kim C
Kim Dong-han
Kim Dong-hyun 
Kim Dong-hyun
Kim Dong-jun
Kim Dong-wan
Kim Feel
Kim Hee-chul 
Kim Hyun-joong 
Kim Hyung-jun 
Kim Jae-duck
Kim Jae-hwan
Kim Jae-hyun
Kim Jae-joong 
Kim Jae-yong
Kim Jeong-hoon
Kim Ji-hoon
Kim Ji-hoon
Kim Ji-soo
Kim Jin-ho
Kim Jin-woo
Kim Jong-hyun 
Kim Jong-kook
Kim Jong-min
Kim Joon 
Kim Jung-mo
Kim Jung-woo
Kim Junsu 
Kim Ki-bum 
Kim Kyu-jong 
Kim Min-kyu
Kim Ryeo-wook
Kim Se-yong
Kim Seok-jin
Kim Sun-woong
Kim Sung-jae
Kim Sung-joo
Kim Sung-kyu 
Kim Tae-woo 
Kim Woo-jin
Kim Woo-seok
Kim Woo-sung
Kim Yo-han
Kim Yong-jun
Kino
Ko Ji-yong
Koo Jun-hoe
Kris Wu
Kwak Jin-eon
Kwon Hyun-bin

L

L 
Lai Kuan-lin
Lay Zhang 
Lee Chan-hyuk
Lee Chang-min
Lee Chang-sub
Lee Dae-hwi
Lee Donghae
Lee Eun-sang
Lee Gi-kwang 
Lee Gun-woo
Lee Hong-bin
Lee Hong-gi 
Lee Hyun
Lee Jae-hoon
Lee Jae-jin 
Lee Jae-won
Lee Jae-yoon
Lee Jai-jin
Lee Je-no
Lee Jin-hyuk
Lee Jong-hwa
Lee Jong-hyun 
Lee Joon 
Lee Jun-ho 
Lee Jun-young
Lee Jung
Lee Jung-shin
Lee Ki-seop
Lee Min-hyuk
Lee Min-hyuk
Lee Min-woo
Lee Sang-min
Lee Seok-hoon
Lee Seung-gi
Lee Seung-hoon 
Lee Seung-hyub
Lee Sung-jong 
Lee Sung-min 
Lee Sung-yeol 
Lee Tae-hwan
Lee Tae-il
Lee Tae-min 
Lee Tae-yong
Lee You-jin
Leeteuk 
Leo
Li Wenhan
Lil Boi
Lim Seul-ong
Louie
Lu Han
Lucas Wong

M

Mark Lee
Mark Tuan
Mikey
Min Kyung-hoon
Mino
Minos
Mir
Mithra Jin
MJ 
Moon Bin 
Moon Hee-joon
Moon Ji-hoo
Moon Jong-up
Moon Joon-young
Moon Tae-il

N

N
Na Jae-min
Nam Tae-hyun
Nam Woo-hyun 
Naul
Nichkhun 
Niel
No Min-woo

O

Oh Jong-hyuk
Oh Se-hun 
Ok Taec-yeon
One
Onew 
Ong Seong-wu

P

P.O
Parc Jae-jung
Park Chanyeol 
Park Geon-il 
Park Hyung-sik
Park Ji-hoon
Park Jin-young
Park Jung-min 
Park Kyung
Park Si-hwan
Park Sun-ho
Park Sung-hoon 
Park Woo-jin 
Park Yong-ha
Park Yoo-chun 
Peniel Shin
Psy

Q

Qin Fen

R

Rain
Ravi
Ren
RM
Rocky 
Roh Ji-hoon
Roh Tae-hyun
Rowoon
Roy Kim

S

Sam Kim
Samuel
San E 
Sanchez
Sandeul
Seo Eun-kwang
Seo In-guk
Seo Kang-joon
Seo Min-woo
Seo Taiji
Seungri 
Seven
Shin Dong-ho 
Shin Hye-sung
Shin Jong-kook
Shin Jung-hwan
Shin Seung-hun
Shin Won-ho
Shindong
Shownu
Sleepy
Son Dong-woon 
Son Ho-jun
Son Ho-young
Song Seung-hyun 
Song Yuvin
Suga
Suho 
Sung Hoon
Swings

T

T.O.P
Tablo
Taebin
Taeyang 
Takuya Terada
Teddy Park
Ten
The8
Thunder
Tiger JK
Tony Ahn

U

U-Kwon

V

V

W

Wang Yibo
Wen Junhui
Wonho
Woody
Wooseok
Woozi
Wuno

X

Xiumin

Y

Yang Hyun-suk
Yang Seung-ho
Yang Yo-seob 
Yeo Hoon-min 
Yeo One
Yesung 
Yong Jun-hyung
Yoo Il
Yoo Jae-suk
Yoo Seon-ho
Yoo Seung-jun
Yoo Seung-woo
Yoo Young-jae
Yook Sung-jae
Yoon Do-hyun
Yoon Doo-joon 
Yoon Hyun-sang
Yoon Ji-sung
Yoon Jong-shin
Yoon Kye-sang
Yoon Min-soo
Yoon San-ha
Young K
Youngjun
Yugyeom
Yunho
Yuta Nakamoto
Yuto Adachi

Z

Zelo 
Zhong Chenle
Zhou Mi
Zhou Yixuan
Zhu Zhengting
Zick Jasper
Zico

Female

A

Ah Young
Ahn Ji-young
Ahn So-hee
Ahn Sol-bin
Ailee
AleXa
Alexandra Reid
Ali
Amber Liu 
An Ye-seul
An Yu-jin
Anda
Arin

B

Bada
Bae Seul-ki
Bae Suzy 
Bae Woo-hee
Baek A-yeon
Baek Ji-young
Baek Ye-rin
Bang Min-ah
Ben
BoA
Bona
Byul

C

Cao Lu
Chae Jung-an
Chae Ri-na
Chaeyoung
Cheng Xiao
Cheris Lee
Cho Mi-yeon
Cho Seung-hee
Choi Han-bit
Choi Jung-in
Choi Soo-eun
Choi Soo-young 
Choi Ye-na
Choi Yoo-jung
Choi Yu-jin
Chu Ye-jin
Chungha
Chuu
CL

D

Dahyun
Dana
Dawon
Dia

E

Elly
Elkie Chong
Esna
Eugene
Euna Kim
Eunha
Eunwoo
Exy
Eyedi

F

Fat Cat
Fei
Ferlyn Wong

G

G.NA
Gain 
Gil Hak-mi
Gilme
Go Woo-ri
Goo Hara
Gummy

H

Hahm Eun-jung 
Han Chae-young
Han Hye-ri
Han Seung-yeon 
Han Sun-hwa
Hana
Hani
Harisu
Heo Ga-yoon
Heo Sol-ji
Heo Young-ji 
Hitomi Honda
Hong Jin-kyung
Hong Jin-young
Horan
Huh Chan-mi
Hwangbo 
Hwang In-sun
Hwang Jung-eum
Hwasa
Hwayobi
Hynn
Hyojung
Hyolyn 
Hyomin 
Hyuna

I

I
Im Yoon-ah
Irene
IU
Ivy

J

J
Jamie
Jang Jae-in
Jang Na-ra
Jang Won-young
Jang Ye-eun
JeA
Jennie
Jeon Boram
Jeon Hye-bin
Jeon Ji-yoon
Jeon So-yeon
Jeon Somi
Jeong Eun-ji
Jeongyeon
Jessi
Jessica Jung
Jia 
Jihyo
Jisoo
Jiyul
Jo Eun-byul
Jo Yu-ri
Johyun 
Joo
JooE 
Joy 
Jun Hyo-seong 
Jung Chae-yeon
Jung Da-eun
Jung Ha-na 
Jung Ryeo-won
Juniel
Juri Takahashi
Jurina Matsui

K

Kahi
Kan Mi-youn
Kang Ji-young
Kang Mi-na
Kang Min-hee
Kang Min-kyung
Kang Se-jung
Kang Si-ra
Kang Ye-seo
Kang Ye-won
Katie Kim
Kei
Ki Hui-hyeon
Kim Ah-joong
Kim Chanmi
Kim Da-som
Kim Do-ah
Kim Do-yeon
Kim E-Z
Kim Ga-young
Kim Greem
Kim Hyo-yeon 
Kim Isak
Kim Jae-kyung
Kim Ji-hyun
Kim Ju-na
Kim Jung-ah 
Kim Min-ju
Kim Min-seo 
Kim Nam-joo
Kim Se-jeong
Kim Seol-hyun 
Kim Si-hyeon
Kim So-hee
Kim So-hee
Kim So-hye
Kim So-jung
Kim Sook
Kim Wan-sun
Kim Ye-won
Kim Yeon-ji 
Kim Yoon-ah
Kim Yoon-ji
Kim Yu-bin
Kriesha Chu
Krystal Jung 
Kwon Eun-bi
Kwon Eun-bin
Kwon Jin-ah
Kwon Mina
Kwon Nara
Kwon Ri-se
Kwon So-hyun
Kwon Yu-ri

L

Lee Ahyumi
Lee Bo-ram
Lee Chae-yeon
Lee Hae-in
Lee Hae-in
Lee Hae-na
Lee Hae-ri
Lee Hee-jin
Lee Hi
Lee Hwa-kyum
Lee Hye-ri
Lee Hyori 
Lee Hyun-joo
Lee Ji-hye
Lee Ji-hyun
Lee Jin 
Lee Jin-ah
Lee Joo-yeon 
Lee Ju-eun
Lee Jung-hyun
Lee Na-eun
Lee So-jung
Lee Soo-jung
Lee Soo-mi
Lee Soo-min
Lee Soo-young
Lee Su-hyun
Lee Su-ji
Lee Sun-bin
Lee Young-yoo
Lee Yu-ri
Lena Park
Lexie Liu
Lexy
Lim Jeong-hee 
Lim Kim
Lim Na-young
Lina
Lisa
Liu Xiening
Luda
Luna 
Lyn

M

Mako Kojima
Meng Meiqi
Michelle Lee
Miho Miyazaki
Mijoo
Min 
Min Do-hee
Min Hae-kyung
Min Hyo-rin
Mina
Minnie
Mint
Minzy
Miru Shiroma
Miryo
Miyu Takeuchi
Momo Hirai
Moonbyul

N

Na Hae-ryung
Nada 
Nako Yabuki
Nam Gyu-ri
Nana 
Nancy
Narsha
Natty
Nayeon
NC.A
Nicole Jung

O

Ock Joo-hyun
Oh Ha-young
Oh Seung-ah
Oh Yeon-seo

P

Park Bo-ram
Park Bom
Park Cho-a 
Park Cho-rong
Park Gyeong-ree
Park Gyu-ri 
Park Hee-von
Park Hye-su
Park Jeong-hwa
Park Ji-yeon 
Park Ji-yoon
Park Jung-ah 
Park Si-eun 
Park So-jin
Park So-yeon
Park Soo-ah
Park Soo-jin
Park Subin
Park Ye-eun
Park Yoon-ha
Pearl

Q

Qri

R

Ra Mi-ran
Raina
Reina Kubo
Rena Hasegawa
Rosé
Rothy
Rumble Fish
Ryu Hwa-young 
Ryu Hyo-young
Ryu Se-ra
Ryu Su-jeong

S

Sae Murase
Sakura Miyawaki
Sana
Sandara Park 
Seo Hye-lin
Seo Hyun-jin
Seo In-young
Seo Ji-young
Seo Yu-na
Seohyun
Seola
Seulgi
Seunghee
Shannon
Shim Eun-jin
Shim Mina
Shin Hye-jeong 
Shin Ji
Shin Ji-hoon
Shin Ji-min 
Shoo
SinB
Solar
Solbi
Somin
Son Dam-bi
Son Ji-hyun 
Son Na-eun
Son Seung-yeon
Song Ji-eun 
Song Yuqi
Soojin 
Sori
Sorn
Soy Kim
Soya
Soyou
Stella Jang
Stephanie
Sulli 
Sunday
Sung Yu-ri
Sunmi
Sunny
Sunye

T

Taeyeon 
Tasha Low
Tiffany Young
Tomu Muto
Tzuyu

U

U Sung-eun
U;Nee
Uee 
Uhm Jung-hwa
Umji

V

Victoria Song 
Viki

W

Wax
Wendy 
Wheein
Woo Hye-mi
Woo Hye-rim
Wu Xuanyi

X

Xiyeon
Xu Ziyin

Y

Yang Hye-sun
Yang Yoo-jin
Yebin
Yeonwoo
Yeri
Yerin 
Yezi
Yoo Ara 
Yoo Chae-yeong
Yoo So-young
Yoo Yeon-jung
YooA
Yoon Bo-mi
Yoon Bo-ra
Yoon Chae-kyung
Yoon Eun-hye
Yoon Mi-rae
Yua Mikami
Yuju
Yūka Kato
Yukika Teramoto
Yura
Yuri

Z

Z.Hera
Zhang Bichen
Zhang Liyin
Zhou Jieqiong
Zia

See also
For the list of idol bands, see List of South Korean idol groups.
For the list of girl groups, see List of South Korean girl groups.
For the list of boy groups, see List of South Korean boy groups.

References

K-pop musicians
K-pop
musicians